Brenthurst Gardens is a  private garden in Johannesburg, South Africa attached to Brenthurst Estate, the residence of the Oppenheimer family, led by Nicky Oppenheimer.

See also 
 Around the World in 80 Gardens

Books and publications

References

Notes

External links
 Brenthurst Gardens website
 The Diamond Route website from De Beers

Gardens in South Africa
Parks in Johannesburg